is a professional Japanese baseball player. He plays pitcher for the Chunichi Dragons.

Katsuno is a graduate of Gifu Prefectural Toki Commercial High School and played for the industrial league team, Mitsubishi Heavy Industries, Nagoya where he led his team to their first All-Japan Championship in 2018. He was also selected in the all industrial league Japanese representative team at the 2018 Asian Games.

On 25 October 2018, Katsuno was selected as the 3rd draft pick for the Chunichi Dragons at the 2018 NPB Draft and on 21 November signed a provisional contract with a ¥65,000,000 sign-on bonus and a ¥12,000,000 yearly salary. He was presented with the number 41 jersey previously worn by 2011 MVP winning reliever, Takuya Asao.

References

1997 births
Living people
Baseball people from Gifu Prefecture
Japanese baseball players
Nippon Professional Baseball pitchers
Chunichi Dragons players
Baseball players at the 2018 Asian Games
Asian Games silver medalists for Japan
Medalists at the 2018 Asian Games
Asian Games medalists in baseball